The women's singles competition at the 2021 FIL European Luge Championships was held on 10 January 2021.

Results
The first run was held at 10:33 and the second run at 11:55.

References

Women's singles
2021 in Latvian women's sport